Robert Lyman, FRHistS (born 13 June 1963) is a British military historian. He has published a number of popular books on the Second World War.

Biography

Education
Lyman was educated at Scotch College, Melbourne and joined the British Army at the age of 18. He was commissioned into the Light Infantry from the Royal Military Academy Sandhurst in 1982 and left the army as a Major.

Career
Following his career in the British Army, Lyman has published over 16 books on the Second World War in Europe, North Africa and Asia. He is widely regarded to be authoritative on the war in the Far East, in particular the Burma Campaign. He regularly appears on TV and radio and reviews books for newspapers and magazines. His presentation of the case for Field Marshal Sir William Slim won a National Army Museum debate in 2011 for Britain's Greatest General and his case for Kohima/Imphal won a National Army Museum debate in 2012 for Britain's Greatest Battle. Lyman regularly gives lectures at organisations such as the National Army Museum, and he is also a battlefield guide.

Lyman has been a trustee of the Kohima Educational Trust since 2004, and chairman between 2008 and 2016.

He is a fellow of the Royal Historical Society.

Personal life
He lives in Shurlock Row in rural Berkshire, England with his wife Hannah and their children.

Published works

Other contributions
Wrote a chapter in Professor Gary Sheffield's book The Challenges of High Command (Palgrave Macmillan, 2003).
Wrote the foreword to David Rooney's Stilwell, The Patriot.
Contributed to General Sir Richard Dannatt's biography Leading from the Front.
Contributed to Jeffrey Archer's second volume of the Clifton Chronicles, The Sins of the Father.

Broadcasts
Historian on Who Do You Think You Are documentaries for Alan Cumming and Nicky Campbell.
He was the historical consultant to the BBC for the VJ Day ceremonies in 2015 and 2020.
He contributed to the documentary series Narrow Escapes of WW2.

External links
 The Kohima Educational Trust

References

1963 births
Living people
People educated at Scotch College, Melbourne
Alumni of the University of York
Alumni of the University of Wales
Alumni of Cranfield University
Alumni of King's College London
Alumni of the University of East Anglia
British military historians